Colin Andre Carter (born January 30, 1954) is Professor of Agricultural and Resource Economics at the University of California, Davis. His research/teaching interests include international trade, futures markets, and commodity markets.

Carter is an Albertan. He was born and raised on a grain farm in Sexsmith, Alberta, Canada. He obtained a BA in Economics and an MS in Agricultural Economics from the University of Alberta. He then studied at University of California, Berkeley where he completed an MA in Economics and a Ph.D. in Agricultural Economics in 1980. From 1980 to 1986, he held the position of Assistant Professor in Agricultural Economics at the  University of Manitoba. He is now a professor at UC Davis.

Carter has published more than 130 research papers, and has authored or edited 15 books. He has published in the areas of international trade, commodity markets, agricultural policy, futures and options markets, the economics of China's agriculture, and the economics of agricultural biotechnology. Colin has received a number of professional awards for Quality of Research Discovery; for Quality of Communication, and for Distinguished Policy Contribution. In 2001, he won the American Agricultural Economics Association (AAEA) award for "Outstanding Essay for the 21st Century" for Will China Become a Major Force in World Food Markets?, co-authored with Scott Rozelle. Carter was named Fellow of AAEA in 2000 in recognition of his contributions to the field of agricultural economics.

Carter has written a textbook on Futures and Options Markets and teaches a UC Davis undergraduate class on futures and options markets and a graduate class on international commodity trade. In 2013, he was listed as one of the 15 Commodity-Friendly professors on Commodity HQ.

Since 1985, he has travelled extensively to China, studying China's domestic commodity markets and China's participation in the international agricultural market. In 1988, with Professor Funing Zhong from Nanjing Agricultural University, he published one of the first books to explain the economic effects of the decollectivization of China's agriculture.

Carter has taken an active role in national and international professional societies. From 1986-89, he held a 3-year fellowship in international food systems from the Kellogg Foundation. Colin served as chair of the UC Davis Department of Agricultural and Resource Economics from 1998 to 2001. He is currently Chair of the Giannini Foundation of Agricultural Economics.

Carter has extensive litigation experience as an economics expert witness, dealing with the following commodities: wheat, corn, barley, rice, orange juice, hogs, cattle, onions, strawberries, tomatoes, and potatoes. He has worked on a number of legal cases involving the economics of commodity markets and he has testified in court and in front of domestic and international trade tribunals. Colin has worked on a number of international antidumping cases as an expert witness. He has written a number of economic reports for litigation purposes and has been deposed numerous times as an economics expert. Often, his analysis involves estimating economic damages or measuring the market impacts of international commodity trade. He has also testified on the economics of state-trading monopolies such as the Canadian Wheat Board.

See also
List of University of California, Davis faculty

References

External links
Colin A. Carter Official page at University of California, Davis

University of California, Davis faculty
UC Berkeley College of Natural Resources alumni
People from the County of Grande Prairie No. 1
Living people
Canadian economists
University of Alberta alumni
1954 births
UC Berkeley College of Letters and Science alumni